Johann Adam Möhler (6 May 1796 – 12 April 1838) was a German Roman Catholic theologian.

He was born at Igersheim in the Bailiwick of Franconia of the Teutonic Order (from 1809 on part of Württemberg), and after studying philosophy and theology in the lyceum at Ellwangen, entered the University of Tübingen in 1817. Ordained to the priesthood in 1819, he was appointed to a curacy. He returned to Tübingen where he became privatdozent in 1825, an associate professor of theology in 1826 and a full professor in 1828.

His lectures drew large audiences that included many Protestants. The controversy aroused by his Symbolik (1832) was such that in 1835 he left for the University of Munich, because of polemics with the Protestant Tübingen theologian Ferdinand Christian Baur. In 1838 he was appointed to the deanery of Würzburg, but died shortly afterwards.

He died young but was very influential for other theologians, such as Henri de Lubac, Yves Congar, and others.

As a church historian, he has a more confessional and conservative orientation and organic thinking.

Works
Möhler wrote:
Die Einheit in der Kirche oder das Princip des Katholicismus, dargestellt im Geiste der Kirchenväter der drei ersten Jahrhunderte (Tübingen, 1825). English translation (1995): Unity in the Church or the Principle of Catholicism: Presented in the Spirit of the Church Fathers of the First Three Centuries, Peter C. Erb, trans., Catholic University of America Press, Washington, D.C.,  
Athanasius der Grosse und die Kirche seiner Zeit, besonders im Kampfe mit dem Arianismus. In six books (2 volumes, Mainz, 1827).
Symbolik oder Darstellung der dogmatischen Gegensätze der Katholiken und Protestanten nach ihren Öffentlichen Bekenntnisschriften (Mainz, 1832; 8th edition, 1871–72; English translation by S. B. Robertson, 1843) This is a study of doctrinal differences between various Christian confessions. Central in this work is the anthropology and soteriology and the unity of the Church.
Neue Untersuchungen der Lehrgegensätze zwischen den Katholiken und Protestanten (1834) – New studies of the doctrinal differences between Catholics and Protestants.
Gesammelte Schriften u. Aufsätze, edited by Döllinger (1839)
Patrologie, with Franz Xaver Reithmayr (1839).

A Biographie by Balthasar Wörner was published at Regensburg in 1866.

The Symbolik is his most famous work; the interest excited by it in Protestant circles is shown by the fact that within two years of its appearance it had elicited three replies of considerable importance, those namely of FC Baur, PK Marheineke and KI Nitzsch.

References

External links
 Catholic Encyclopedia: Johann Adam Möhler
 Johann Adam Möhler: Vom Geist der Theologie. Gesammelte Aufsätze (German). Hrsg. von Dieter Hattrup. Band 1. Paderborn, 2011.
 Johann Adam Möhler: Vom Geist der Theologie. Gesammelte Aufsätze (German). Hrsg. von Dieter Hattrup. Band 2. Paderborn, 2011.
 

1796 births
1838 deaths
People from Main-Tauber-Kreis
19th-century German Catholic theologians
German male non-fiction writers
19th-century German male writers
19th-century German writers
University of Tübingen alumni
Academic staff of the University of Tübingen
Academic staff of the Ludwig Maximilian University of Munich